The Broadcasting Institute of Maryland was an American broadcasting school located in Baltimore, Maryland. Operating from 1969 to 2015, it was accredited by the Accrediting Commission of Career Schools and Colleges (ACCSC).

External links
Official website

1969 establishments in Maryland
Broadcasting in the United States